Gary Adelson (born April 22, 1953) is an American television and film producer.

Biography
Adelson is the son Lori (née Kaufman) and Merv Adelson. He has one sister and a brother: Ellen Adelson Ross and Andrew Adelson.

Filmography

References

External links

1953 births
Adelson family
American film producers
American people of Russian-Jewish descent
American television producers
Jewish American television producers
Jewish American film producers
Living people